Petasobathra is a genus of moths in the family Lyonetiidae.

Species
Petasobathra sirina Meyrick, 1915 
Petasobathra ishnophaea (Meyrick, 1930)

External links
Butterflies and Moths of the World Generic Names and their Type-species

Lyonetiidae